Sheila Humphreys, also known as Sighle Humphreys (26 February 1899 – 14 March 1994), was an Irish political activist and member of Cumann na mBan.

Background
Sheila Humphreys was born in Limerick into a wealthy family and raised at Quinsborough House, County Clare. She was the only daughter of Dr David Humphreys and Nell Humphreys (née Mary Ellen Rahilly). Her father suffered from tuberculosis and died when she was four years old. Her mother was the sister of Michael Joseph 'The O'Rahilly' who was killed during the 1916 Easter Rising. Her two brothers, Emmet and Dick, attended Pearse's St Enda's School and Dick served alongside The O'Rahilly in the GPO in 1916. The family moved to 54 Northumberland Road, Dublin in 1909. Sheila attended Mount Anville Secondary School, where she was head girl and became a fluent Irish speaker.

Political activities
Humphreys spent a year in Paris (1919–20).  She joined Cumann na mBan in 1919, aged 20, which organisation was founded in response to the very few women at the Sinn Féin Convention of October 1917. Humphreys served variously as secretary, director of publicity and national vice-president. She was on the committee of the Irish Volunteer Dependants' Fund after the Rising.  She was engaged in finding safe-houses for those on the run.  The family home at 36 Ailesbury Road was used as an IRA safe house throughout the War of Independence.  The Dáil Cabinet had weekly meetings and frequently used the big house on Ailesbury Road. To ministers like Robert Barton, the embryonic republic was protected by a hard shell of army and politicians, but this did not prevent women in the movement being arrested. When Ernie O'Malley was captured at the Humphreys home in 1922, she was one of those imprisoned. Humphreys took part in the nationwide 1923 Irish Hunger Strikes. She was finally released on 29 November 1923 after a thirty-one day hunger strike.  

The family took the anti-Treaty position during the Civil War and the house on Ailesbury Road was the object of regular raids by Free State forces. The most significant raid took place on 4 November 1922 when IRA Assistant Chief of Staff Ernie O'Malley was wounded and arrested in a protracted shoot-out with Free State soldiers. At the time, only Humphreys, her mother and aunt were staying in the house with O'Malley. Humphreys played an active part in resisting the raid, though she always denied reports that she was responsible for shooting a Free State soldier who died in the fighting. She always said that Ernie O'Malley was 'a soldier above all', Since 1916, "Soldiers are We" was the unofficial national anthem of the Republic. The incident is described in detail in O'Malley's memoir of the Civil War, The Singing Flame. In 2003, the raid was the subject of an hour-long docudrama entitled The Struggle. The film was directed and scripted by Humphrey's grandsons Manchán Magan and Ruán Magan and produced by RTÉ.

Humphreys, her mother and aunt were arrested in the aftermath of the raid of 4 November. Sheila was put in solitary confinement and she went on hunger strike in protest.  She went on a further hunger-strike, this time for 31 days, when she was among the prisoners confined after the end of the Civil War in May 1923.

Later life
Humphreys continued her involvement with Cumann na mBan after the Civil War, contributing significantly to the republican movement throughout the 1920s and 1930s. She became the Cumann representative on the Republican Council in 1929. She was in Mountjoy Jail in 1926, 1927, 1928, and 1931. In 1928 she went on a six-day hunger strike, and was designated as a political prisoner. Despite her affluent background, Humphreys was active in the socialist republican organisation Saor Éire, serving as the group's co-treasurer from 1931.  In 1934 she resigned from the Republican Congress, but her Sinn Féin principles were more important, as they had criticised the IRA.

She married Domhnall O'Donoghue (1897–1957), a member of Dublin Brigade IRA. They had two children, Dara and Croine. Her husband was imprisoned in 1936 for making seditious speeches. She tried to keep the Cumann going following the president's resignation, in 1941 she briefly served as Cumann na mBan's president. She served as President of the St Vincent de Paul Society (1937–1975), and also the Political Prisoners Committee until 1949; although she continued to support the Prisoners Dependants campaigns, necessarily for women (1951–89). Her causes continued to be consistently those of Sinn Féin: anti-EEC, and very strongly Catholic, promoting the Mass on television, all in the Irish language.

O'Donoghue became involved with Clann na Poblachta on its foundation and stood as a Clann candidate in the 1948 general election. He died in 1957. Humphreys continued to live at their home in Donnybrook for many years.

She died, aged 95, at Our Lady's Hospice, Harold's Cross on 14 March 1994. She is buried in Glasnevin Cemetery.

References

Bibliography
The Humphreys Papers P106, University College Dublin Archives Department.

 Anonymous, 'Cumann na mBan in Easter Week: Tribute from a Hostile Source', Wolfe Tone Annual, undated.
 Anonymous, 'Report of the Irish National Aid and Volunteer Dependants Fund', The Catholic Bulletin, August 1919.
 Manley, T, Sighle Humphreys, Her Republican Beliefs, MA Thesis presented in the History Department, National University of Ireland, Maynooth, 2002.
 O'Malley, E, The Singing Flame, Dublin, Anvil 1978.
 Purdon, E, The Irish Civil War 1922–23 Cork, Mercier Press 2000.
 Reynolds, M., 'Cumann na mBan in the GPO', An t-Oglach, March 1926.

1899 births
1994 deaths
Clann na Poblachta politicians
Cumann na mBan members
Irish activists
Irish women activists
Irish revolutionaries
People educated at Mount Anville Secondary School
Women in war 1900–1945
Women in war in Ireland